Sni-A-Bar Township is a township in Lafayette County, in the U.S. state of Missouri.

Sni-A-Bar Township was derived from the stream of the same name.

References

Townships in Missouri
Townships in Lafayette County, Missouri